Andrea Collarini and Andrés Molteni were the defending champions, but only Molteni defended his title partnering Rogério Dutra Silva. Molteni successfully defended his title, defeating Nicolás Barrientos and Fabrício Neis 7–5, 6–3 in the final.

Seeds

Draw

References
 Main Draw

Blu Panorama Airlines Tennis Cup - Doubles
2016 Doubles